Etlingera subterranea is a monocotyledonous plant species that was first described by Richard Eric Holttum, and given its current name by Rosemary Margaret Smith. Etlingera subterranea is part of the genus Etlingera and the family Zingiberaceae. No subspecies are listed in the Catalog of Life.

References 

subterranea
Taxa named by Rosemary Margaret Smith